Kalli is a German and Old Norse masculine given name that is a diminutive form of Karl. Notable people with this name include the following:

Given name
Kalli Bjarni (born 1976), Icelandic singer
Kalli Dakos, Canadian children's poet 
Kalli Kalde (born 1967), Estonian painter, graphic artist and illustrator

Surname
Eeva Kalli (born 1981), Finnish politician
Leszli Kálli, Colombian kidnap victim
Timo Kalli (born 1947), Finnish politician

See also

Kali (name)
Kalla (name)
Kalle
Kallio (surname)
Kallu (name)
Karli (name)

References

German masculine given names
Old Norse personal names